Matthys J. Daffue (born 13 January 1989) is a South African professional golfer on the Korn Ferry Tour. He earned enough points on the Korn Ferry Tour in 2022 to qualify for the PGA Tour in 2022–23.

College career 
Born in Pretoria, South Africa, Daffue started his college golf career at Lee University before transferring to Lamar University, where he played his final three years. At Lamar, he won five tournaments, including the 2011 and 2012 Southland Conference Championships. He was an National Association of Intercollegiate Athletics All-American and the 2011 Southland Conference player of the year.

Professional career 
Daffue played his first Korn Ferry Tour event in 2019. In the 2021–22 season, Daffue successfully Monday qualified for six PGA Tour events. In 2022, he qualified for the U.S. Open by winning the final qualifying tournament, and took the lead in the second round.

Personal life 
Daffue lives in Kingwood, Texas with wife Kamila and son. In 2014, Kamila's mother was struck by a car and killed. He has also worked as a volunteer assistant for the University of Houston golf team.

Professional wins (1)

NGA Pro Golf Tour wins (1)
2013 NeSmith Chevrolet Classic

Playoff record
Korn Ferry Tour playoff record (0–1)

Results in major championships

"T" = tied

See also
2022 Korn Ferry Tour Finals graduates

References

External links

South African male golfers
PGA Tour golfers
Korn Ferry Tour graduates
1989 births
Living people